Ingolstädter Jazztage is a jazz festival in Germany.

Jazz festivals in Germany